The Dobricel is a right tributary of the river Ilișua in Romania. It flows into the Ilișua in Dobric.

References

Rivers of Romania
Rivers of Bistrița-Năsăud County